Adriana Serra (27 November 1923 – 13 November 1995) was an Italian film actress. She appeared in 18 films between 1943 and 1952. She was born in Milan, Italy. She was Miss Italia in 1941.

Filmography

 Mont Oriol (1958)
 Miracle in Viggiù (1951)
 Abbiamo vinto! (1951)
 The Two Sergeants (1951)
 La bisarca (1950)
 Totò Tarzan (1950)
 Cintura di castità (1950)
 The Firemen of Viggiù (1949)
 Se fossi deputato (1949)
 Fifa e arena (1948)
 Eleven Men and a Ball (1948)
 Il vento mi ha cantato una canzone (1947)
 The Models of Margutta (1946) (uncredited)
 Paese senza pace (1946)
 The Innocent Casimiro (1945)
 La prigione (1944)
 Apparition (1943)
 T'amerò sempre (1943)
 I Do Not Move (1943)

References

External links

1923 births
1995 deaths
Italian film actresses
20th-century Italian actresses
Italian beauty pageant winners
Actresses from Milan